Ray Basham may refer to:

 Raymond E. Basham (born 1945), member of the Michigan Senate
 Ray Basham (baseball), American baseball catcher in the Negro leagues